Edgar Joel Elizalde Ferreira (born 27 February 2000) is a Uruguayan professional footballer who plays as a defender for Argentine Primera División club Independiente.

Club career
He made his Serie B debut for Pescara on 28 October 2017 in a game against Brescia. On 19 August 2019, he joined Catanzaro on loan. On 29 January 2020, Pescara recalled him from loan.

On 22 January 2021, Elizalde was loaned to Juve Stabia in Serie C. On 6 August 2021, he joined Peñarol on loan.

On 7 July 2022, Argentine club Independiente signed Elizalde on permanent basis on a contract until December 2025.

Career statistics

Club

Honours
Peñarol
 Uruguayan Primera División: 2021
 Supercopa Uruguaya: 2022

References

External links
 

2000 births
Living people
Uruguayan people of Basque descent
People from Florida Department
Uruguayan footballers
Association football defenders
Uruguay youth international footballers
Uruguay under-20 international footballers
Uruguayan Primera División players
Serie B players
Serie C players
Montevideo Wanderers F.C. players
Delfino Pescara 1936 players
U.S. Catanzaro 1929 players
S.S. Juve Stabia players
Peñarol players
Club Atlético Independiente footballers
Uruguayan expatriate footballers
Uruguayan expatriate sportspeople in Italy
Uruguayan expatriate sportspeople in Argentina
Expatriate footballers in Italy
Expatriate footballers in Argentina